Environmental hermeneutics is a term for a wide range of scholarship that applies the techniques and resources of the philosophical field of hermeneutics to environmental issues. That is to say it addresses issues of interpretation as they relate to nature and environmental issues broadly conceived to include wilderness, ecosystems, landscapes, ecology, the built environment (architecture), life, embodiment, and more. Work in environmental philosophy, ecocriticism, environmental theology, ecotheology, and similar disciplines may overlap the field of environmental hermeneutics.

In the public sphere, much of the focus on “the environment” is concerned with discovering scientific facts and then reporting how policy can act on these facts.  On its face, philosophical hermeneutics might appear to be an unrelated enterprise. But... even the facts of the sciences are given meaning by how humans interpret them. Of course this does not mean that there are no facts, or that all facts must come from scientific discourse. Rather... [it calls] for mediation—the mediation that grounds the interpretive task of connecting fact and meaning through a number of different structures and forms. (Clingerman, et al. 2013, emphasis added)

See also
Ecosemiotics

References

Notes

Bibliography 
 Abram, D. (1996). The Spell of the Sensuous, New York: Vintage.
 Brown, C. S. and T. Toadvine (2003). Eco-Phenomenology: Back to the Earth Itself, New York: SUNY Press.
 Clingerman, F. and B. Treanor, M. Drenthen, D. Utsler (2013). Interpreting Nature: The Emerging Field of Environmental Hermeneutics, New York: Fordham University Press.
 Clingerman, F. and M. Dixon (2011). Placing Nature on the Borders of Religion, Philosophy and Ethics, London: Ashgate.
 Cronon, William (1992). “A Place for Stories: Nature, History, and Narrative.” Journal of American History 78 (1992): 1347-76.
 Drenthen, M. and J. Keulartz (2014). Environmental Aesthetics: Crossing Divides and Breaking Ground, New York: Fordham University Press
 Gare, Arran (1998). “MacIntyre, Narratives, and Environmental Ethics.” Environmental Ethics 20 (1998): 3-21.
 Keller, K. (2003). The Face of the Deep, London: Routledge
 Kohák, E. (1984). The Embers and the Stars: A Philosophical Inquiry into the Moral Sense of Nature, Chicago: University of Chicago Press. 
 Mugerauer, R. (1995). Interpreting Environments, Austin, TX: University of Texas Press
 Plumwood, Val (1993). Feminism and the Mastery of Nature, London: Routledge
 Treanor, Brian (2014). Emplotting Virtue: A Narrative Approach to Environmental Virtue Ethics. New York: SUNY Press.
 Van Buren, John (1995). “Critical Environmental Hermeneutics.” Environmental Ethics 17 (1995): 259-275. 
 Wood, D. (2006). “On the Way to Econstruction” in Environmental Philosophy, vol. 3, issue 1 (Spring 2006)

Environmental ethics
Environmental philosophy
Hermeneutics